William Neal Hallford (born October 17, 1966) is an American game designer, book author, screenwriter, and independent film director. He is best known for his work on the fantasy role-playing games Betrayal at Krondor, Dungeon Siege, and Champions of Norrath.

On October 9, 1995, Hallford was in a train wreck aboard Amtrak's Sunset Limited, westbound from Miami to Los Angeles. An unknown perpetrator or perpetrators signing themselves the "Sons of the Gestapo" left four notes on the site claiming responsibility, two of which were found by Hallford. Since that time, Hallford has appeared in two television specials about the event, When Trains Crash: Blood on the Tracks and Derail: America's Worst Train Wrecks, which were broadcast in the US, UK and Canada.

Works

Games
Planet's Edge: The Point of No Return (1992) – New World Computing
Betrayal at Krondor (1993) – Dynamix
Return to Krondor (1998) – Sierra Online Inc.
Dungeon Siege (2002) – Gas Powered Games

Books
Krondor: the Betrayal (1999) (co-author of original story with Raymond E. Feist and John Cutter)
Swords & Circuitry: A Designer's Guide to Computer Role-Playing Games (2001) (with Jana Hallford)
The Derailment of the Sunset Limited (2012)

Films
Beauty and the Beast: 20 Years of Remembering (2007) — an online documentary about the CBS television series, Beauty and the Beast, produced and directed by Neal Hallford's production company, Swords & Circuitry Studios
The Case Of Evil (2014) — a narrative fiction horror short film, produced and directed by Neal Hallford's production company, Swords & Circuitry Studios

Radio

"Uncharted Regions" radio dramas
Shadow of the Bulldog Man (1984) – KTOW Radio
Calls Waiting (1987) – KTOW Radio
The October Harvest (1989) – KTOW Radio

References

External links

Living people
1966 births
American video game designers